Nahuel Juan Adolfo Cisneros (born 17 February 1998) is an Argentine professional footballer who plays as an attacking midfielder for Newell's Old Boys.

Career
Cisneros began in 2006 with Boca Juniors, where he'd be loaned out on two occasions to Villarreal and Defensa y Justicia. He joined Newell's Old Boys in 2018. On 28 January 2019, Cisneros completed a loan move to Campeonato Brasileiro Série C side Náutico. He made his professional debut on 30 January 2019 in a Campeonato Pernambucano victory over Petrolina. He appeared once more in the competition against Sport Recife, in what was the second leg of the final; which they lost. In May, Cisneros appeared in the Copa do Nordeste versus Campinense, prior to featuring in Série C in a win over Imperatriz on 4 May.

Cisneros returned to Newell's in June 2019, having suffered continuous problems related to a shoulder injury; the loan had initially been set until 30 October 2019.

Career statistics
.

Notes

References

External links

1998 births
Living people
People from Lomas de Zamora
Argentine footballers
Association football midfielders
Argentine expatriate footballers
Expatriate footballers in Brazil
Argentine expatriate sportspeople in Brazil
Campeonato Brasileiro Série C players
Newell's Old Boys footballers
Clube Náutico Capibaribe players
Sportspeople from Buenos Aires Province